Tim White (born July 30, 1950) is an American news anchor and investigative reporter known for his role as host of the FOX-TV / Sci-Fi Channel / syndicated paranormal documentary series Sightings from 1992 to 1997. In 2002, White narrated the United States version of the Discovery Channel documentary program The Future Is Wild on the possible evolution of life on Earth. From 1999 to 2008, Tim was the co-anchor of the Evening News broadcasts for NBC Affiliate WKYC-TV, Channel 3 in Cleveland, Ohio.

Biography 

White, who was born Dale Timothy White in Detroit, and raised in Clare, Michigan, attended college at Michigan State University and the University of Southern California, and earned a doctorate in communications from the University of Maryland. He served in the Air Force Reserve, attaining the rank of brigadier general.

Accomplishments and awards 

White's on-air television credits include WJZ-TV (Baltimore), WCVB-TV (Boston), and WTTG-TV (Washington, D.C.), where he won multiple Emmy Awards anchoring Fox Morning News. He has also hosted programs for PBS, CBS-TV, CNN, Turner Broadcasting, Knowledge TV, Paramount Pictures, and Worldnet. White joined WKYC-TV Channel 3, Gannett's NBC affiliate in Cleveland, Ohio in 1999. White is also inducted into the Ohio Radio and Television Broadcasters Hall of Fame.

On December 12, 2008, White opted to leave WKYC as a result of his contract not being renewed. The two parties could not come to an agreement on the financial terms of a new contract.

White is the president of Lives and Legacies Films, Inc. which has produced the PBS series First Person Singular, most notably a program on the life of Elie Wiesel. After managing his own news group company in Cody, Wyoming for the past few years, White currently resides in Arlington, Virginia.

Career as Air Force Reserve general

White retired from the Air Force Reserve as a Brigadier General on August 14, 2006. White had also served as Director of Public Affairs, Office of the Secretary of the Air Force, the Pentagon, Washington, D.C. and Mobilization Assistant to Director of Strategic Communication.

Major achievements and decorations

   Legion of Merit
   Meritorious Service Medal with oak leaf clusters
   Air Force Commendation Medal
   Joint Service Commendation Medal

Effective dates of promotion

  Second ;ieutenant – June 9, 1971
  First lieutenant – May 15, 1973
  Captain – June 23, 1978
  Major – March 7, 1988
  Lieutenant colonel – June 15, 1992
  Colonel – September 1, 1996
  Brigadier general – August 14, 2001

References

External links
Tim White Interview at Famous Interview Website
Elie Wiesel: First Person Singular

Living people
Television anchors from Cleveland
Michigan State University alumni
University of Southern California alumni
United States Air Force generals
University of Maryland, College Park alumni
People from Clare, Michigan
Television anchors from Boston
Television anchors from Baltimore
Television anchors from Detroit
1949 births
Recipients of the Legion of Merit